Ta' Ganu Windmill (also known as Tal-Maħlut Windmill) is an eighteenth century windmill in Birkirkara, Malta. It was built in 1724 by the António Manoel de Vilhena Foundation. "Maħlut", the alternative name also used for it historically, is the Maltese word for a mixture of wheat and hops used for making bread.

After a long period of abandonment, in 1990 the windmill was entrusted to Maltese artist Gabriel Caruana who renovated it and turned it into a venue for art exhibitions.

References

Windmills completed in 1724
Windmills in Malta
National Inventory of the Cultural Property of the Maltese Islands
Birkirkara